Moussa Doumbouya (born 1 January 1998) is a Guinean professional footballer who plays as a centre-forward for FC Ingolstadt.

Career
Doumbouya made his professional debut for Hannover 96 in the 2. Bundesliga on 21 February 2021, coming on as a substitute in the 71st minute for Valmir Sulejmani against Fortuna Düsseldorf. The away match finished as a 3–2 loss for Hannover.

References

External links
 
 

1998 births
Living people
Sportspeople from Conakry
Guinean footballers
Association football forwards
Hannover 96 II players
Hannover 96 players
FC Ingolstadt 04 players
2. Bundesliga players
3. Liga players
Regionalliga players
Guinean expatriate footballers
Guinean expatriate sportspeople in Germany
Expatriate footballers in Germany